Peter J. McArdle (1874–1940) also known as P.J. McArdle was a labor activist and local politician in Pittsburgh.

Born in Belpre, Ohio and growing up in Muncie, Indiana, McCardle moved from Muncie to Pittsburgh in 1905 when he was elected President of the Amalgamated Association of Iron and Steel Workers. He was a rolling mill worker and union council member influential in the Amalgamated Association of Iron and Steel Workers (hosting the 1909 convention) and the Steel strike of 1919.  McArdle was elected to Pittsburgh City Council, serving from 1911–1913, 1916–1919, 1922–1930, and 1932–1940. He was a member of the City Planning Commission when the Mt. Washington Roadway was proposed in 1912.  McArdle's home in later life was on Bigham Street in the Mt. Washington neighborhood of Pittsburgh.

His son, Joseph A. McArdle, became a Pittsburgh City Councilmember and United States Congressman. His great-grandson is actor Zachary Quinto, and their family story (focusing especially on P.J. McArdle) was featured on the 2022 series finale of the NBC television series Who Do You Think You Are?

McArdle ran in the 1933 Republican primary for Pittsburgh mayor.

References

1874 births
1940 deaths
American trade union leaders
People from Belpre, Ohio
People from Muncie, Indiana
Pittsburgh City Council members
Amalgamated Association of Iron and Steel Workers people
Trade unionists from Indiana